The Ruggles is an early American family-oriented situation comedy series broadcast live on ABC. Episodes were recorded on kinescope, and some of them survive in the UCLA Film and Television Archive. The series began October 23, 1949 — a couple of weeks after the radio hit The Life of Riley had moved to television on NBC — and ended on June 19, 1952. The Ruggles was also one of the first shows to originate from Hollywood rather than New York City, where most radio programs had been produced. It aired in New York City via kinescope beginning November 3, 1949.

Cast and changes
The star of the series is comedian Charlie Ruggles, playing a character with the same name. His wife, Margaret Ruggles, was played in the first season by Irene Tedrow, thereafter by Erin O'Brien-Moore. The television family also had four children: college co-ed Sharon Ruggles (Margaret Kerry), high school student Chuck Ruggles (Tom Bernard), and the young twins, Donna and Donald, played by Judy Nugent and Jimmy Hawkins. During the second season (1950–51), Lonnie Burr played an occasional recurring character named Oliver Quimby, a know-it-all neighbor kid.

Synopsis

Charlie Ruggles is a department manager for a company. His boss, Mr. Williams, and his secretary Miss Peabody were seldom seen, and the exact nature of the firm's business was never clearly stated.  His wife Margaret kept house, while their daughter Sharon attended UCLA, though she lived at home.  Son Chuck was in high school, and the twins were in elementary school.

Most shows take place with just the family members in attendance. Because the shows were broadcast live, the set had to be large and elaborate. There was no audience on the set and no laugh track. The recorded theme music was played for entrances and exits. The final episode of the show, broadcast June 19, 1952, featured the wedding of Sharon Ruggles.

References

External links
 
 The Ruggles Christmas episodes at Internet Archive

1949 American television series debuts
1952 American television series endings
1940s American sitcoms
1950s American sitcoms
American Broadcasting Company original programming
American live television series
Black-and-white American television shows
English-language television shows
Television series about families